Thomas Sheehan (born 25 June 1941) is an American philosopher who is the current professor at the Department of Religious Studies, Stanford University and Professor Emeritus at the Department of Philosophy, Loyola University Chicago. He is known for his books on Heidegger and Roman Catholicism. His philosophical specialties are in philosophy of religion, twentieth-century European philosophy, and classical metaphysics. He is the author of The First Coming, a controversial account of Easter.

Bibliography
 Heidegger's Being and Time. A New Reading. New Heidegger Research. London (England) 2022. 304 p.
 Making sense of Heidegger. A paradigm shift. New Heidegger Research. London (England) 2015. XX, 350 p.
 Facticity and Ereignis. Interpreting Heidegger. Critical essays. Ed. Daniel O. Dahlstrom. Cambridge (England) 2011. p. 42–68.
 Martin Heidegger: Logic. The question of truth. Translated by Thomas Sheehan. Studies in Continental Thought. Bloomington (Indianapolis) 2010. XII, 356 p.
 Becoming Heidegger. On the trail of his early occasional writings 1910–1927. Ed. Theodore Kisiel and Thomas Sheehan. Northwestern University Studies in Phenomenology and Existential Philosophy. Evanston (Illinois) 2007. LXXIV, 534 p.
 Dasein. A companion to Heidegger. Ed. Hubert L. Dreyfus, Mark A. Wrathall. Blackwell Companions to Philosophy. 29. Malden (Massachusetts) 2005. p. 193–213.
 General introduction. Husserl and Heidegger. The making and unmaking of a relationship. Edmund Husserl: Collected works. Ed. by Thomas Sheehan and Richard E. Palmer. Vol. 6: Psychological and transcendental phenomenology and the confrontation with Heidegger (1927–1931). The Encyclopædia Britannica article, the Amsterdam lectures, „Phenomenology and Anthropology“ and Husserl's marginal notes in Being and Time and Kant and the problem of metaphysics. Ed. and transl. by Thomas Sheehan and Richard E. Palmer. Dordrecht (Netherlands) 1997. p. 1–32.
 Heidegger’s Lehrjahre. The Collegium Phaenomenologicum. The first ten years. Ed. John C. Sallis, Giuseppina Moneta, and Jacques Taminiaux. Phaenomenologica. Ed. Samuel Ijsseling. 105. Dordrecht (Netherlands) 1988. p. 77–137.
 Karl Rahner. The philosophical foundations. Series in Continental Thought 9. Athens (Ohio) 1987. 320 p.
 The first coming. How the Kingdom of God became Christianity. 1986.
 Heidegger. The man and the thinker. Ed. Thomas Sheehan. Chicago (Illinois) 1981. XX, 348 p.
 Introduction. Heidegger, the project and the fulfillment. Heidegger. The man and the thinker. Ed. Thomas Sheehan. Chicago (Illinois) 1981. p. VII–XX.
 Getting to the topic. The new edition of Wegmarken. Research in phenomenology. 7. 1977. p. 299–316.
 Heidegger’s early years. Fragments for a philosophical biography. Listening. 12. 1977. p. 3–20. Heidegger. The man and the thinker. Ed. Thomas Sheehan. Chicago (Illinois) 1981. p. 3–19.
 Heidegger, Aristotle, and phenomenology. Philosophy today. 19. 1975. p. 87–94.
 Notes on a lovers’ quarrel. Heidegger and Aquinas. Listening. 9. 1974. p. 137–143.
 Heidegger. From beingness to the time-being. Listening. 8. 1973. p. 17–31.

References

Living people
1941 births
21st-century American philosophers
20th-century American philosophers
Continental philosophers
Daseinsanalysis
Existentialists
Phenomenologists
Stanford University faculty
University of California, Berkeley alumni
Philosophy academics
Loyola University Chicago faculty
Fordham University alumni
Heidegger scholars
German–English translators
Members of the Jesus Seminar